The 6th Hollywood Critics Association Film Awards, presented by the Hollywood Critics Association, took place on the evening of February 24, 2023 at the Beverly Wilshire Hotel, Beverly Hills, while the winners of the 1st Hollywood Critics Association Creative Arts Awards were announced earlier in the day on social media platforms. The nominations for both events were announced on the HCA official YouTube channel and app on December 8 and December 15, 2022, respectively; Jalyn Hall, Jude Hill, and Madeleine McGraw announced the December 15 nominations. Comedian Tig Notaro hosted the ceremony.

Everything Everywhere All at Once led the nominations with ten, followed by The Banshees of Inisherin with seven. The former also received six HCA Creative Arts Awards nominations, bringing the film's total to sixteen nominations. Everything Everywhere All at Once ultimately won the most awards with six wins, including Best Picture and Best Director (the Daniels); plus, one Creative Arts Award: Best Editing.

The ceremony was broadcast live on KNEKT Television Network, and streamed on the official HCA YouTube channel and app.

Winners and nominees
Winners are listed first and highlighted with boldface.

Special Honorary awards
 Spotlight Award – RRR
 Star on the Rise Award – Gabriel LaBelle
 Artisan Achievement Award – Rick Carter
 Acting Achievement Award – Angela Bassett
 Filmmaking Achievement Award – Rian Johnson

Films with multiple wins
The following films received multiple awards:

Films with multiple nominations
The following films received multiple nominations:

See also
 2nd Hollywood Critics Association TV Awards
 1st Hollywood Critics Association Creative Arts Awards
 5th Hollywood Critics Association Midseason Film Awards

References

External links
 

2022 film awards
2022 in Los Angeles
2022 in American cinema
2023 awards in the United States
Film Awards 06